Bojan Tokić (born 13 January 1981) is a Slovenian table tennis player.

Career 
Tokić's first competition was in Montpellier, where he won the ETTU Cup. Via Cagliari, Italy and Ljubljana, Slovenia he transferred to SV Plüderhausen, Germany in the 2000–01 season. He then went back to Slovenia to work within a training group, with which he stayed for three years. In 2003, he returned to Germany to play for TTC Frickenhausen. In 2005–06, he won the ETTU Cup, the DTTB Cup and the German League with the TTC Frickenhausen. In the 2007 European Championships he reached the quarter-finals in the men's singles competition.

Tokić has participated at the 2008 Summer Olympics in Beijing, where he lost in the third round to the eventual champion Ma Lin. At the 2009 World Table Tennis Championships in Yokohama, he lost in the third round against Kaii Yoshida. In 2010, Tokić attended the 2010 Slovenian Open international table tennis tournament. In October 2011, he won a bronze medal in both the singles and doubles competitions of the 2011 European Championships. At the 2012 Olympics, he again lost in the third round, this time to Gao Ning of Singapore.

At the 2016 Olympics in Rio de Janeiro, he lost in the fourth round against Dimitrij Ovtcharov. Tokić took the 1–0 lead after playing the longest table tennis game in history of the Olympics, scoring 64 points total which means he won 33 to 31. He eventually lost the game 4–1.

Achievements 
 Singles Bronze medal European Championships
 Doubles Bronze medal 2009 and 2011 European Championships

References

External links 
 
 
 
 
 
 

1981 births
Living people
People from Jajce
Slovenian male table tennis players
Olympic table tennis players of Slovenia
Panathinaikos table tennis players
Table tennis players at the 2008 Summer Olympics
Table tennis players at the 2012 Summer Olympics
Table tennis players at the 2016 Summer Olympics
Slovenian people of Bosnia and Herzegovina descent
Table tennis players at the 2015 European Games
European Games competitors for Slovenia
Mediterranean Games bronze medalists for Slovenia
Mediterranean Games medalists in table tennis
Competitors at the 2005 Mediterranean Games
Table tennis players at the 2019 European Games
Table tennis players at the 2020 Summer Olympics